Cornelius Marquis Elder (born October 9, 1994) is an American football cornerback who is a free agent. He played college football at Miami and was drafted by the Carolina Panthers in the fifth round of the 2017 NFL Draft. Elder has also been a member of the New York Giants and Detroit Lions.

Early years
Elder was a four-star running back coming out of high school and was a back to back Mr. Football Player of the Year in Tennessee. He was a two-sport star in high school and had a basketball offer from Purdue University. When he first arrived at the University of Miami, he joined the basketball team. After a torn meniscus in his right knee, he decided to focus solely on football.

Professional career

Carolina Panthers 
Elder was drafted by the Carolina Panthers in the fifth round, 152nd overall, in the 2017 NFL Draft. On September 3, 2017, he was placed on injured reserve due to a knee injury.

Elder was waived during final roster cuts on August 30, 2019.

New York Giants 
On September 2, 2019, Elder was signed to the New York Giants practice squad.

Carolina Panthers (second stint) 

On November 12, 2019, Elder was signed by the Carolina Panthers off the Giants' practice squad.

Detroit Lions
Elder signed with the Detroit Lions on April 1, 2021. He was released on August 31, 2021.

Carolina Panthers (third stint) 
On September 14, 2021, Elder was signed to the Carolina Panthers' practice squad.

Washington Football Team / Commanders
Elder was signed off of the Panthers' practice squad on October 13, 2021. He re-signed on January 11, 2022.

On August 30, 2022, Elder was waived by the Commanders and signed to the practice squad the next day.

References

External links
Washington Commanders bio

1994 births
Living people
American football cornerbacks
Carolina Panthers players
Detroit Lions players
Miami Hurricanes football players
New York Giants players
Players of American football from Nashville, Tennessee
Washington Commanders players
Washington Football Team players